In mathematics, a topological ring is a ring  that is also a topological space such that both the addition and the multiplication are continuous as maps:

where  carries the product topology. That means  is an additive topological group and a multiplicative topological semigroup.

Topological rings are fundamentally related to topological fields and arise naturally while studying them, since for example completion of a topological field may be a topological ring which is not a field.

General comments

The group of units  of a topological ring  is a topological group when endowed with the topology coming from the embedding of  into the product  as  However, if the unit group is endowed with the subspace topology as a subspace of  it may not be a topological group, because inversion on  need not be continuous with respect to the subspace topology. An example of this situation is the adele ring of a global field; its unit group, called the idele group, is not a topological group in the subspace topology.

If one does not require a ring to have a unit, then one has to add the requirement of continuity of the additive inverse, or equivalently, to define the topological ring as a ring that is a topological group (for ) in which multiplication is continuous, too.

Examples

Topological rings occur in mathematical analysis, for example as rings of continuous real-valued functions on some topological space (where the topology is given by pointwise convergence), or as rings of continuous linear operators on some normed vector space; all Banach algebras are topological rings. The rational, real, complex and -adic numbers are also topological rings (even topological fields, see below) with their standard topologies. In the plane, split-complex numbers and dual numbers form alternative topological rings. See hypercomplex numbers for other low-dimensional examples.

The -adic topology on the integers is an example of an -adic topology (with ).

Completion

Every topological ring is a topological group (with respect to addition) and hence a uniform space in a natural manner. One can thus ask whether a given topological ring is complete. If it is not, then it can be completed: one can find an essentially unique complete topological ring  that contains  as a dense subring such that the given topology on  equals the subspace topology arising from 
If the starting ring  is metric, the ring  can be constructed as a set of equivalence classes of Cauchy sequences in  this equivalence relation makes the ring  Hausdorff and using constant sequences (which are Cauchy) one realizes a (uniformly) continuous morphism (CM in the sequel)  such that, for all CM  where  is Hausdorff and complete, there exists a unique CM  such that 
 If  is not metric (as, for instance, the ring of all real-variable rational valued functions, that is, all functions  endowed with the topology of pointwise convergence) the standard construction uses minimal Cauchy filters and satisfies the same universal property as above (see Bourbaki, General Topology, III.6.5).

The rings of formal power series and the -adic integers are most naturally defined as completions of certain topological rings carrying -adic topologies.

Topological fields

Some of the most important examples are topological fields. A topological field is a topological ring that is also a field, and such that inversion of non zero elements is a continuous function. The most common examples are the complex numbers and all its subfields, and the valued fields, which include the -adic fields.

See also

Citations

References

 
 
 
 
 Vladimir I. Arnautov, Sergei T. Glavatsky and Aleksandr V. Michalev: Introduction to the Theory of Topological Rings and Modules. Marcel Dekker Inc, February 1996, .
 N. Bourbaki, Éléments de Mathématique. Topologie Générale. Hermann, Paris 1971, ch. III §6

Ring theory
Topology
Topological algebra
Topological groups